"I Wonder Do You Think of Me" is a song written by Sanger D. Shafer, and recorded by American country music artist Keith Whitley.  It was posthumously released in June 1989 as the first single and title track from the album I Wonder Do You Think of Me.  The song was Whitley's fourth number one on the country chart.  The single went to number one for one week and spent a total of fourteen weeks on the country chart.

Chart performance

Year-end charts

References

1989 singles
Keith Whitley songs
Songs written by Sanger D. Shafer
Song recordings produced by Garth Fundis
RCA Records singles
Songs released posthumously
1989 songs